J. F. Laldailova or Joseph Francis Laldailova (9125-1979) was a writer of Mizo literature. He joined Saint Placid's High School in Chittagong in 1935. He later joined the Indian Air Force as a bandmaster. Revered as Mizo William Shakespeare, JF Laldailova was known for his extensive knowledge of Mizo literature and for his exceptional command of English and the Mizo language. He is best remembered for his English to Mizo dictionary, and also for his translation works, literary criticism and being the editor of a literary magazine.

See also 
 Mizo literature

References 

1925 births
1979 deaths
Scholars from Mizoram
Mizo people
Indian male writers
Writers from Mizoram